The 2009 Denmark Super Series was a top level badminton competition held from October 20, 2009 to October 25, 2009 in Odense, Denmark. It was the ninth BWF Super Series competition on the 2009 BWF Super Series schedule.

Men's singles

Seeds

  Peter Gade
  Sony Dwi Kuncoro
  Joachim Persson
  Wong Choong Hann
  Simon Santoso
  Chetan Anand
  Jan Ø. Jørgensen
  Chen Long

Top half

Bottom half

Finals

Women's singles

Seeds

  Wang Yihan
  Tine Rasmussen
  Pi Hongyan
  Saina Nehwal
  Juliane Schenk
  Petya Nedelcheva
  Adriyanti Firdasari
  Ai Goto

Top half

Bottom half

Finals

Men's doubles

Seeds

  Markis Kido / Hendra Setiawan
  Koo Kien Keat / Tan Boon Heong (Champion)
  Mathias Boe / Carsten Mogensen
  Mohd Zakry Abdul Latif / Mohd Fairuzizuan Mohd Tazari
  Alvent Yulianto Chandra / Hendra Aprida Gunawan
  Lars Påske / Jonas Rasmussen
  Anthony Clark / Nathan Robertson
  Xu Chen / Guo Zhendong

Top half

Bottom half

Finals

Women's doubles

Seeds

  Chin Eei Hui / Wong Pei Tty
  Kamilla Rytter Juhl / Lena Frier Kristiansen
  Shendy Puspa Irawati / Meiliana Jauhari
  Nitya Krishinda Maheswari / Greysia Polii
  Miyuki Maeda / Satoko Suetsuna
  Pan Pan / Zhang Yawen
  Mizuki Fujii / Reika Kakiiwa
  Helle Nielsen / Marie Røpke

Top half

Bottom half

Finals

Mixed doubles

Seeds

  Nova Widianto / Lilyana Natsir
  Joachim Fischer Nielsen / Christinna Pedersen
  Thomas Laybourn / Kamilla Rytter Juhl
  Valiyaveetil Diju / Jwala Gutta
  Hendra Aprida Gunawan / Vita Marissa
  Tao Jiaming / Zhang Yawen
  Anthony Clark / Donna Kellogg
  Devin Lahardi Fitriawan / Lita Nurlita

Top half

Bottom half

Finals

References

External links
Denmark Super Series 2009 at tournamentsoftware.com

Denmark Open
Denmark Super Series
2009 in Danish sport
Sport in Odense